Gelvard-e Kuchek (also Romanized as Gelvard-e Kūchek; also known as Gīlavard-e Kūchek and Gīlavard Kūchek) is a village in Peyrajeh Rural District, in the Central District of Neka County, Mazandaran Province, Iran. At the 2006 census, its population was 24, in 12 families.

References 

Populated places in Neka County